John Joseph Becker (January 22, 1886 – January 21, 1961) was an American composer of contemporary classical music, a pianist, a conductor, a writer on music, and a music administrator. In the early 1930s he was especially active as a conductor, giving midwestern premieres of works by his close friend Charles Ives, as well as music by fellow American composers Carl Ruggles and Wallingford Riegger.

Life
Becker was born in Henderson, Kentucky, and began his formal musical education at the Cincinnati Conservatory, receiving his diploma in 1905. He then pursued graduate studies at the Wisconsin Conservatory of Music in Milwaukee, where he earned a doctorate in composition in 1923. His composition teachers included Alexander von Fielitz, Carl Busch, and Wilhelm Middelschulte. After a period of comparative obscurity, his career as an educator and administrator began in 1917 at the University of Notre Dame, where he taught for ten years. A devout Catholic, he relocated to another Catholic institution, the College of St. Thomas in St. Paul, Minnesota, where he taught from 1929 until 1933. From 1935 to 1941 he administered the Federal Music Project in Minnesota, and for a time was associate editor of the New Music Quarterly, founded by Henry Cowell, whom he had first met in 1928. He returned to teaching at Barat College in Lake Forest, Illinois from 1943 until his retirement in 1957. His activities diminished with his declining health, and he died in Wilmette, Illinois, one day short of his seventy-fifth birthday in 1961 .

Legacy
The John J. Becker Papers are held by the Music Division of the New York Public Library. Another collection, the Dr. John J. Becker (1886–1961) Papers, is held at the University of St. Thomas Libraries in Minnesota.

Works 

The Abongo, for percussion ensemble (1933)
Antigone
At Dieppe
Chinese Miniatures
Choral Mass in C Minor
City of Shagpat
Concerto Arabesque
Concerto for Horn and Orchestra
Concerto for Viola and Orchestra (1937)
Concerto for Violin and Orchestra
Concerto Pastoral: A Forest Rhapsodie
Etude Primitive
Fantasia Tragica
Faust
Favours of the Moon
Four Poems from the Japanese
Four Songs
Heine Song Cycle
I Fear Thy Kisses
Improvisation for Organ
Jesu Dulcis Memoria
Julius Caesar
The Lark
Life of Man
Little Sleeper, voice and string quartet
Little Songs
Magdalen and Judas
A Marriage with Space
Martin of Tours
Mass in Honor of the Sacred Heart
Mass in Unison or Two Parts
Mater Admirabilis
Memory
Missa Symphonica
Moments from the Liturgical Year
Moments from the Passion
Morning Song
The Mountains
My Little Son, Eighteen Months Old
Naomi the Beautiful
Nostalgic Songs of the Earth
O Domino Mea!
Orchestral Sketches
Out of the Cradle Endlessly Rocking
Pater Noster
Piano Quintette, piano and strings
The Pool
Privilege and Privation
Play by Alfred Kreymborg
Psalms of Love
Queen of Cornwall
Satirico
Season of Pan
Separation on the River Kiang
Seven Last Words
Sonata in One Movement for Piano
Sonate American for Violin and Piano
Soundpiece #1 for Piano and Strings
Soundpiece #2 "Homage to Haydn" for String Orchestra
Soundpiece #3
Soundpiece #4
Soundpiece #5, A Short Sonata for Piano
Soundpiece #6, A Short Sonata in One Movement for Flute and Clarinet
Soundpiece #8
Stars About the Lovely Moon
The Snow Goose, Legend of the Second World War, A Passacaglia - Tone *Poem for Large Orchestra
Symphony #1 	
Symphony #2, Fantasia Tragica, A Short Symphony in One Movement
Symphony #3, Symphonia Brevis
Symphony #4
Symphony #5, Homage to Mozart in Two Movements
Symphony #6
Symphony #7
Taking Leave of a Friend
Tantum Ergo
The Tempest
Two Architectural Impressions
Two Simple Songs
Two Songs for Voice and Piano
Unison Mass in Honor of Saint Madeleine Sophie Barat
Vigilanti
When the Willow Nods
You and I together
You Are Not Here This April

References

Further reading
 Cowell, Henry. 1933. "John J. Becker". In American Composers on American Music: A Symposium, edited by Henry Cowell, 82–84. Stanford: Stanford University Press. Reprinted in Essential Cowell: Selected Writings on Music by Henry Cowell, 1921–1964, edited by Richard Carter Higgins and Bruce McPherson, with a preface by Kyle Gann, 85–90. Kingston, NY: Documentext, 2002. .
 Crawford, Lawrence Eugene. 1988. "Harmonic and Melodic Organization in the Later Works of John J. Becker". PhD diss. Washington, DC: Catholic University of America.
 Gann, Kyle. 1984. "The Percussion Music of John J. Becker". Percussive Notes 22, no. 3:26–41. 
 Gillespie, Don C. 1976. "John Becker, Musical Crusader of Saint Paul". The Musical Quarterly 62, no. 2 (April): 195–217.
 Gillespie, Don C. 1977. "John Becker: Midwestern Musical Crusader". PhD diss. Chapel Hill: University of North Carolina.
 Gillespie, Don C. 1980. "John Becker's Correspondence with Ezra Pound: the Origins of a Musical Crusader". Bulletin of Research in the Humanities 83:163–71. 
 Riegger, Wallingford. 1959. "John J. Becker". American Composers Alliance Bulletin 9, no. 1:2–7.

External links
John J. Becker papers, JPB 04-27. Music Division, The New York Public Library for the Performing Arts.
Dr. John J. Becker (1886–1961) Papers at University of St. Thomas Libraries

1886 births
1961 deaths
20th-century American composers
20th-century classical composers
American classical composers
American male classical composers
Modernist composers
Musicians from Kentucky
People from Henderson, Kentucky
Pupils of Bernhard Ziehn
20th-century American male musicians